North Wosera Rural LLG is a local-level government (LLG) of East Sepik Province, Papua New Guinea.

Wards
01. Kumunikum 1
02. Kumunikum 2
03. Kumunikum 3
04. Tatemba
05. Babandu
06. Wisukum
07. Numamaka
08. Stapikum
09. Talengi
10. Kitikum
11. Numbingei
13. Gualakum
14. Kwatmukum
15. Sarikum
16. Bukibalikum
17. Jambitangit
18. Wapindumaka
19. Jipako
20. Manjikoruwi
21. Umunko
23. Jipakim
24. Ugutakua
25. Weiko
26. Dumek
27. Nungwaia
28. Kwanga

References

Local-level governments of East Sepik Province